The Gardner gun was an early type of mechanical machine gun. It had one, two or five barrels, was fed from a vertical magazine or hopper and was operated by a crank. When the crank was turned, a feed arm positioned a cartridge in the breech, the bolt closed and the weapon fired. Turning the crank further opened the breechblock and extracted the spent case.

Development
The Gardner machine gun was invented in 1874 by William Gardner of Toledo, Ohio, formerly a captain in the Union Army during the American Civil War. After producing a prototype he went to the Pratt and Whitney company, who after a year of development produced a military version of the weapon.

A demonstration to officers at the United States Navy yard in 1875 was successful, however they recommended that Pratt and Whitney continue with development of the system, incorporating improvements to the feed system, which were designed by E. G. Parkhurst, an engineer at Pratt and Whitney. The army attended the tests, but showed no interest in the weapon.

Parkhurst added many improvements to the gun's firing mechanism which made it more reliable. During 1877 additional tests took place with a .45 calibre (11.4 mm) version of the weapon, which determined its muzzle velocity to be 1,280 feet per second (390 m/s).

On 17 June 1879 a further demonstration was carried out at the Navy Yard, during which the weapon was presented by Francis A. Pratt and Amos Whitney. The weapon fired a total of 10,000 rounds during the test, taking a total elapsed time of 27 minutes 36 seconds, with breaks between firing to resolve an issue with one of the extractors. While the test was not without issues the weapon managed to fire 4,722 rounds before the first stoppage, and after the stoppage was resolved it fired approximately 5,000 rounds without incident.

On 15 January and 17 March 1880 duplicate tests were conducted at Sandy Hook proving ground in front of an Army review board. The weapon performed well, and they recommended that the Army buy a limited number for field evaluation, noting the low cost of the weapon. However the Army declined to purchase.

At this point, the British Royal Navy, which had successfully deployed the Gatling gun, became interested in the weapon, and Gardner was invited to England to exhibit his invention. The Admiralty were so impressed by the demonstrations that they adopted the weapon and purchased the rights to produce it in England. Gardner remained in England to supervise the construction of the weapons.

The British Army then took an interest in machine guns and after a series of trials selected the Gardner gun. During these tests a five-barrelled Gardner gun fired 16,754 rounds before a failure occurred, with only 24 stoppages. When operator-induced errors were taken into account, there were only four malfunctions in 10,000 rounds fired. The Army adopted the weapon, although its introduction was delayed because of opposition from the Royal Artillery. It saw action in the Mahdist War (in Sudan), notably at the Battle of Abu Klea, where its mechanism proved vulnerable to desert sand and dust blowing about.

There was also the .577/450 Martini–Henry calibre Bira gun, based upon the Gardner gun but with dual barrels, an overhead drum magazine, and designed in Nepal.

It is noted that the Bira was only ever produced in very small numbers. These are extremely rare and a wonderful example of Victorian firepower. An American company, International Military Antiques, found a limited number of these exceptionally scarce weapons in the Old Palace of Lagan Silekhana in Kathmandu, Nepal, which were included with the purchase of over 50,000 antique firearms from the Royal Nepalese Army in 2003. There is controversy, as the arms cache had to tranship through India and questions remain as to the purchase.

Users

Conflicts 
War of The Pacific

Mahdist War

First Matabele War

First Sino-Japanese War

World War I

See also

Weapons of comparable role, performance and era
 Nordenfelt gun: similar hand-cranked machine gun

References

Notes

Bibliography 
 George M. Chinn, The Machine Gun. History, Evolution, and Development of Manual, Automatic, and Airborne Repeating Weapons, Volume I.

External links

 Handbook for Gardner and Nordenfelt rifle calibre machine guns. 1889, 1891 at State Library of Victoria
 Handbook for the 0.45" Gardner gun (5 barrels), 1884 at State Library of Victoria
 Handbook for the 0.45" Gardner gun (2 barrels) 1886, 1894 at State Library of Victoria
 Handbook for the 0.303" Nordenfelt 3-barrel, and Gardner 2-barrel, converted from 0.4 and 0.45" M.H. chamber (magazine rifle chamber) : mounted on carriages, field, machine gun, infantry and carriage, parapet, machine gun. London : H.M.S.O. 1900
 Diagram of 2 Barrel Gardner on Field Carriage (converted Gatling) from Victorian Forts and Artillery website
 Gardnerguns.com - History
 Gardnerguns.com - Patents
 An Illustrated Treatise On Ammunition And Ordnance: British 1880-1960
 The .450 Bira Gun, a late nepalese copy of the Gardner Gun
 Rifle Caliber Artillery: The Gardner Battery Gun  (downloadable PDF file) James W. Alley's article on the Gardner Gun for the American Society of Arms Collectors Bulletin No. 89
 Gardner Gun Animations  History, technical description and animations (Requires QuickTime, and not suitable for slow-speed links)

Early machine guns
Multi-barrel machine guns
Machine guns of the United Kingdom
Victorian-era weapons of the United Kingdom